Shaktifarm  is a town and a nagar panchayat in Udham Singh Nagar district in the Indian state of Uttarakhand. Shaktifarm is the centre of many villages around here.

Geography

Demographics
 India census, Shaktigarh had a population of 4776. Males constitute 52% of the population and females 48%. Shaktigarh has an average literacy rate of 61%, higher than the national average of 59.5%: male literacy is 69%, and female literacy is 52%. In Shaktigarh, 16% of the population is under 6 years of age.

References

Cities and towns in Udham Singh Nagar district